Ceramida longitarsis is a species of beetle in the Melolonthinae subfamily. It was described by Johann Karl Wilhelm Illiger in 1803 and is endemic to Portugal.

References

Beetles described in 1803
Endemic arthropods of Portugal
Beetles of Europe
Melolonthinae